Arvo Sirendi (born 4 April 1939 Kuimetsa Parish, Harju County) is an Estonian agronomist and politician. He was a member of VII, VII and IX Riigikogu, representing the Estonian Coalition Party.

References

Living people
1939 births
Estonian agronomists
Estonian Coalition Party politicians
Members of the Riigikogu, 1992–1995
Members of the Riigikogu, 1995–1999
Members of the Riigikogu, 1999–2003
Estonian University of Life Sciences alumni
People from Rapla Parish